Thepperamanallur is a revenue village in the Thiruvidaimarudur taluk of Thanjavur district, Tamil Nadu, India.

References 

 

Villages in Thanjavur district

Sivan temple